Ribonuclease H2, subunit B is a protein that in humans is encoded by the RNASEH2B gene. RNase H2 is composed of a single catalytic subunit (A) and two non-catalytic subunits (B and C), and degrades the RNA of RNA:DNA hybrids. The non-catalytic B subunit of RNase H2 is thought to play a role in DNA replication.

Mutations in this gene are a cause of Aicardi-Goutieres syndrome type 2 (AGS2).

Model organisms 

Model organisms have been used in the study of RNASEH2B function. A conditional knockout mouse line, called Rnaseh2btm1a(EUCOMM)Wtsi was generated as part of the International Knockout Mouse Consortium program — a high-throughput mutagenesis project to generate and distribute animal models of disease to interested scientists.

Male and female animals underwent a standardized phenotypic screen to determine the effects of deletion. Twenty four tests were carried out on mutant mice and three significant abnormalities were observed. No homozygous mutant embryos were identified during gestation, and therefore none survived until weaning. The remaining tests were carried out on heterozygous mutant adult mice and an increased susceptibility to bacterial infection was observed in female animals.

Misincorporated ribonucleotides in DNA are removed by RNASEH2.  Deficient  RNASEH2 activity in mice causes white matter defects, neuroinflammation and atrophy of the cerebellum, conditions that mirror Aicardi-Goutieres syndrome in humans.  Unrepaired DNA damage signalling appears to be the basic cause of the neurodegenerative features that are characteristic of Aicardi-Goutieres syndrome.

Mutagenesis studies

Rnaseh2b gene knockout in mice leads to early embryonic lethality, hence genetically engineered mice with a premature stop codon in exon 7 Rnaseh2b was created. It was hypothesized that growth arrest was a consequence of a p53-dependent DNA damage response associated with the accumulation of single RN in genomic DNA.

Ribonucleotide accumulate in RNaseH2 null cells as a consequence of incorporation by DNA polymerases.  Ribonucleotide incorporation occurs in metazoans and these lesions are harmful to mammalian cells, and their removal is required for mouse embryonic development. Lesions are single or diRN covalently incorporated into genomic DNA, at a frequency of approx. 1.000.000 sites per cell, making it the most common endogenous base lesion in the mammalian genome.  These lesions are best explained by misincorporation by the major replicative polymerases.

RNase H2 is a genome surveillance enzyme required for ribonucleotide removal. ribonucleotide accumulation in genomic DNA of RNaseH2null mice implicates the RNaseH2 complex in the maintenance of genome integrity. These ribonucleotide changes are likely to be harmful, as their ribose 2’-hydroxyl group increases susceptibility of the adjacent phosphodiester bond to hydrolysis. Actually, they report that the ribonucleotides are being incorporated 1 every ~7.600 nt in null cells = 1.300.000 lesions per cell. This have the same order of magnitude predicted from in vitro incorporation rates by eukaryotic replicative polymerases.

Misincorporated ribonucleotide induce DNA damage. It is not that the ribonucleotides do not prevent replication; but rather polDNA can tolerate templates with ribonucleotides, having normal early embryogenesis. The problem appears with excessive numbers of ribonucleotides. DNA damage response signaling activated maybe by incorporation of ribonucleotides in difficult to replicate regions or near other detrimental lesions. They also found chromosomal rearrangements: DNA breaks may origin by replication fork collapse or hydrolysis of RN on opposing DNA strands. Also, the marked activation of DNA damage signaling in embryo may produce a p53-mediated inhibition of proliferation that might contribute to the lethality of null embryos.

Ribonucleotide incorporation in health and disease. Previous studies reported only two contexts where there’s stable incorporation of ribonucleotides: 1) diRibonucleotides in S. pombe may be a signal to initiate homologous recombination. 2) Ribonucleotides in mtDNA (Mouse and HeLa cells). Low levels of ribonucleotides incorporation in the nuclear genome may be tolerated. Actually, aberrant nucleic acid substrates, generated by repair pathways non-RNaseH2 dependent (due to reduced RNaseH2 activity in Aicardi-Goutières Syndrome) are thought to drive innate immune response. Alternatively, ribonucleotides might induce DNA-damage response signaling that by itself may stimulates interferon production.

Ribonucleotides can be highly deleterious to the mammalian cell, causing genome instability, and that the RNaseH2 is a critical enzyme for ensuring integrity of genomic DNA. It also calls for attention and interest about the pathway(s) that remove ribonucleotides from genomic DNA, site and nature of ribonucleotides -induced DNA damage, and distribution of ribonucleotides in the genome. Knowing this, it may gain understanding about the pathological and physiological roles of RN in genomic DNA, of significance to both nucleic acid-driven autoimmunity and carcinogenesis.

References

Further reading

External links 
  GeneReviews/NCBI/NIH/UW entry on Aicardi-Goutières Syndrome

Genes mutated in mice
Human proteins